The South Western Railway (SWR) is one of the 19 railway zones in India, headquartered at Hubballi in Karnataka State. SWR was created from carving out the routes from Southern Railways, South Central Railways and Central Railways in 2003.

History 
The South Western Railway zone came into existence on 1 April 2003 by bifurcating Mysuru and Bengaluru divisions from Southern Railway along with Hubballi division from South Central Railway. It is headquartered at Hubballi and comprises three divisions namely Hubballi, Mysuru, and Bengaluru. The fourth division at Kalaburagi was slated to be the fourth division which was supposed to be carved out from Hubli, Secunderabad, Guntakal and Solapur divisions. Currently the divisional office at Kalaburagi is on hold due to operational constraints.

Jurisdiction

South Western Railway covers most of the railway lines in the state of Karnataka and Goa except the Konkan Railway line, parts of Sri Sathya Sai district and Chittoor district in Andhra Pradesh, Krishnagiri district, parts of Dharmapuri district and Tirupathur district of Tamil Nadu.

Divisions
 Bengaluru railway division
 Mysuru railway division
 Hubballi railway division
 Kalaburagi railway division (Proposed and on hold)

Development

The section between Bengaluru – Mysuru ( is doubled and electrified. The bengaluru – Hubballi line is being doubled till saunshi in Dharawada district of karnataka and electrified till Harihara of Davanagere district. While Bengaluru – Tumakuru was doubled and opened to traffic in 2007, and as of feb 2023, the section is more than 90% doubled. The doubling of the Birur – Chikjajur section of the same line was completed in 2015 while the doubling and electrification of Hubballi – Haveri section is in progress. The doubling of Yelahanka – Penukonda section has been completed till Hindupur and the remaining section is still in progress. The Ballari – Hubballi line is completely doubled and electrified. Gadag – Hotgi and Hubballi – Pune line (via Belagavi) doubling is in progress with electrification. In the 2016 Railway Budget, the electrification of Bengaluru – Salem line via Hosur and Dharmapuri was announced which was completed in July 2021. doubling between Baiyappanahalli and Hosur is in progress. In February 2017, the Bengaluru – Hassan railway line via Shravanabelagola was completed. Construction of new railway lines such as Tumakuru – Chitradurga, Chitradurga – Davanagere, Tumakuru – Kadiridevarapalli, Hubballi – Belagavi via Kittur,  Yalvigi – Gadag, Gadag – Wadi, Ginigera – Raichur, Hubbali – Ankola, Miraj – Bagalkote, Hassan – Chikkamagaluru are either proposed, planned, under construction or partially open for service in phases.

Modernisation
The Mysuru Division of South Western Railways will be designated as "Digital Division" after fully adopting its current technology harnessing programme. The government of India had asked Railways divisions to cut red tape and reduce paperwork in offices. All the officials will adopt technologies like WhatsApp and Google Drive to share reports and other documents. This will save a lot of papers being used for circulating reports as done currently. Two web-based helplines have been launched so that digitised information can be shared among different officials. The inspection reports regarding maintenance, passenger amenities, cleanliness, electronics, and communication, etc. will be managed by a new software which is under construction now. These measures will cut down redundant works, reduce number of registers and reports maintained by officials, reduce paper consumption and improve the efficiency and celerity of operations.

Project Unigauge
Since 2007, the SWR is entirely Indian gauge. SWR has many WDG4, 23 WAP-7, WAG-9HC and WDP-4 locomotives in use.

Routes

Express routes
 20607/08 MYS MAS Vande bharat express via SBC
Rani Chennamma Express, between Bangalore City railway station and Miraj

Loco sheds
 Diesel & Electric Loco Shed, Krishnarajapuram
 Diesel Loco Shed, Hubli

See also
 Zones and divisions of Indian Railways
 All India Station Masters' Association (AISMA)

References

External links
South Western Railway
Indian Railways reservations

Zones of Indian Railways
Rail transport in Karnataka
 
2003 establishments in India